Pitch is a viscoelastic polymer which can be natural or manufactured, derived from petroleum, coal tar, or plants. Various forms of pitch may also be called tar, bitumen, or asphalt. Pitch produced from plants is also known as resin. Some products made from plant resin are also known as rosin.

Uses 

Pitch was traditionally used to help caulk the seams of wooden sailing vessels (see shipbuilding), and to coat earthenware vessels for the preservation of wine. Pitch may also be used to waterproof wooden containers and in the making of torches. Petroleum-derived pitch is black in colour, hence the adjectival phrase, "pitch-black".

The viscoelastic properties of pitch make it well suited for the polishing of high-quality optical lenses and mirrors. In use, the pitch is formed into a lap or polishing surface, which is charged with iron oxide (Jewelers' rouge) or cerium oxide. The surface to be polished is pressed into the pitch, then rubbed against the surface so formed. The ability of pitch to flow, albeit slowly, keeps it in constant uniform contact with the optical surface.

Chasers pitch is a combination of pitch and other substances, used in jewellery making.

Viscoelastic properties 

Naturally occurring asphalt/bitumen, a type of pitch, is a viscoelastic polymer. This means that even though it seems to be solid at room temperature and can be shattered with a hard impact, it is actually fluid and will flow over time, but extremely slowly. The pitch drop experiment taking place at University of Queensland is a long-term experiment which demonstrates the flow of a piece of pitch over many years. For the experiment, pitch was put in a glass funnel and allowed to slowly drip out. Since the pitch was allowed to start dripping in 1930, only nine drops have fallen. It was calculated in the 1980s that the pitch in the experiment has a viscosity approximately 230 billion (2.3×1011) times that of water. The eighth drop fell on 28 November 2000, and the ninth drop fell on 17 April 2014. Another experiment was started by a colleague of Nobel Prize winner Ernest Walton in the physics department of Trinity College in Ireland in 1944. Over the years, the pitch had produced several drops, but none had been recorded. On July 11, 2013, scientists at Trinity College caught pitch dripping from a funnel on camera for the first time.

Winchester College has a 'pitch glacier' demonstration which has been running since 21 July 1906, but does not have records of regular measurements.

Production 
The heating (dry distilling) of wood causes tar and pitch to drip away from the wood and leave behind charcoal. Birchbark is used to make birch-tar, a particularly fine tar. The terms tar and pitch are often used interchangeably. However, pitch is considered more solid, while tar is more liquid. Traditionally, pitch that was used for waterproofing buckets, barrels and small boats was drawn from pine. It is used to make Cutler's resin.

A 10th-century redaction of an earlier Greek Byzantine agricultural work brings down the ancient method of applying pitch to ceramic wine casks:
[A wood-based pitch] is put into an earthen vessel, and it is put over a small fire in the sun, then some hot water percolated through wood-ashes is poured on it, and the pitch is stirred; when it has afterward stood, it is poured out after two hours, then there is as much water again poured in. Having therefore done this thrice every day for three days and having taken up the moisture on the surface, they make the pitch that is left exceedingly good. Dry pitch is also bitter, but being boiled with wine it becomes more useful; [...] and having boiled the mixture to a third part, they use it as properly qualified: but some throw wood-ashes into it and boil it down. In Italy they use pitch of this kind: forty minæ of pitch, one of wax, eight drams of sal ammoniac, six drams of manna. Thus, having pounded them and boiled them together, they sprinkle eight ounces (uncia) of well-ground fenugreek over them and they pitch the cask with them when they are well mixed.
The ceramic ware was pitched, both inside and out, immediately while they were removed from the kiln and still hot.

See also 
 Pine tar
 Asphaltene
 Creosote
 Tar

References

External links 
 The Pitch Drop Experiment
 Pine Tar Production
 Primitive tar and charcoal production

Materials
Chemical mixtures
Amorphous solids
Non-timber forest products